"I Miss You a Little" is a song co-written and recorded by American country music artist John Michael Montgomery.  It was released in February 1997 as the third single from his album What I Do the Best.  It peaked at #6 in the United States, and #5 in Canada.  This is the only single to date that Montgomery has had a songwriting credit on.  The song was written by Montgomery, Richard Fagan and Mike Anthony.

Critical reception
Larry Flick, of Billboard magazine reviewed the song favorably, calling it "a classic-sounding country weeper, dripping in mournful steel guitar." He states that the "heart-tugging lyric is accentuated by Csaba Petocz's skilled production." He goes on to say that Montgomery's tone is "quite vulnerable, and it works well on this heartbreak ballad."

Music video
The music video was directed by Lou Chanatry.

Chart positions
"I Miss You a Little" debuted at number 67 on the U.S. Billboard Hot Country Singles & Tracks for the chart week of March 1, 1997.

Year-end charts

References

1997 singles
1996 songs
John Michael Montgomery songs
Songs written by Richard Fagan
Atlantic Records singles